Vasily Aleksandrovich Nikitin (born on 25 November 1971), is an Uzbek-born politician who had served as the first prime minister of the Luhansk People's Republic in 2014.

Biography

In 1989, he graduated from the 61st school named after Dmitry Karbyshev in Kopeisk, Russia.

He later moved to Kremenna, Luhansk Oblast in Ukraine.

He graduated from Luhansk National Agrarian University in 1994.

In 1995, he became the founder of a private enterprise called "Luhansk plant" Voskhod", as he moved to Luhansk. In early 2000, he left the company. He worked as chief economist at Splav 100 LLC. He created in Luhansk the regional branch of the public organization "All-Ukrainian People's Ecological Union of Gardeners, Gardeners and Florists" VNESSOK ".

In 2008, he founded the farm enterprise “Brothers Nikitin”, and in 2010, he founded the company of ecologically clean products “House Resources”.

In March 2014, Nikitin became an activist of the movement for the People's Referendum, and was the chairman of the Initiative Group. He actively participated in the organization of the referendum on the status of the Luhansk Oblast, which took place on 11 May, and was the deputy chairman of the Central Election Commission.

On 21 April, he was elected chairman of the Presidium of the People's Assembly of the Luhansk Oblast. Since 6 May, he was the head of the Press Center of the "United Army of the South-East". On 18 May 2014, Nikitin was proclaimed the first prime minister of the Luhansk People's Republic.

In early June, the Ukrainian authorities put Nikitin on the wanted list under Part 2 of Article 110 of the Criminal Code ("deliberate actions committed with the aim of changing the borders of the territory or the state border of Ukraine or the constitutional order, by conspiracy of a group of persons").

On 3 July, by the decision of the Head of the Republic, Valery Bolotov, Nikitin was dismissed as prime minister. On 8 July, he was approved by the First Deputy Chairman of the Council of Ministers for Social Policy.

He was included in the sanctions list by the European Union, published on 12 July.

References

1971 births
Living people